DXDS (1161 AM) is a radio station owned and operated by UM Broadcasting Network. The station's studio and transmitter are located in Digos.

It was formerly known as Radyo Ukay from 2000 to June 14, 2020. On June 15, 2020, management decided to retire the branding as it has run its course. DXDS, along with its other AM stations, started carrying their perspective call letters in their brandings. The yellow highlighted in the "X" of their logos means to move forward.

References

Radio stations in Davao del Sur
Radio stations established in 1967